Uuyoka is a small settlement in Onayena Constituency, Oshikoto Region in Namibia, the village has schools including Uuyoka Combined School which comprises grades 1 to 10. The economy is based on substance farming.  It is one of the biggest villages in Onayena. Neighboring settlements are Oniiwe, Uukete, Oniimwandi, Oniiwe, Ompugulu, Oniimwandi, Omandongo, Onambeke, Uukete, Ethindi, Enkolo, Iikokola, Oniihwa, Okakwiyu, Omadhiya, Okambogo, Okakololo Village, Iihongo  Uushinga, Onamutene, Shimbobela, Okaliveva among others. The village is without critical road infrastructures and a clinic, but the school was electrified in 2007.

References

Populated places in the Oshikoto Region